The Highline Fire was a wildfire in Payette National Forest, 23 mile east of Warren in Idaho in the United States. The fire was reported on July 29, 2017. The cause of the fire was lightning. The fire burned  and was contained in August 2017. The fire closed access to many parts of Payette National Forest, including three airstrips. The Highline was accompanied by the nearby Goat Fire, which is burning in the same region, at a smaller acreage.

Events

The Highline Fire was started by a lightning strike on July 28 around 7:00 PM in the Payette National Forest, specifically the Krassel Ranger District, within the Frank Church River of No Return Wilderness.

Crews focused on letting the fire "play its natural ecological role...to the greatest extent possible while protecting the known values of risk." They took actions to suppress the fire regarding protecting property or life, including guard stations, Idaho Fish and Game structures. Historic structures under threat include Stonebraker Ranch and cabins, outbuildings and the Chamberlain USFS Airport at the Chamberlain Guard Station. At this time, the Chamberlain USFS Airport was closed. 

As of August 20, fire crews had begun evaluating structure protection at Root Ranch. The fire had burned  by the evening. By August 23, the Goat Fire had begun, burning  alongside the Highline in the same area. Protection of the Cold Meadows Guard Station began. The first day of September brought additional protection for additional areas and structures, including those located along the Salmon River, including lodges, campgrounds, bridges, cabins and guard stations. 

Both fires remain at zero containment with the goal of letting them run their natural course. The Cold Meadows USFS Airport was closed due to poor runway conditions. As of September 10, the fire was burning  and was at zero containment. The fire made its way to the Rock Rabbit Lookout, which survived.

Evacuations and closures

The Chamberlain Airstrip was closed for several months.

References

External links
 

2017 Idaho wildfires
History of Idaho